Macarthuria australis is an erect or spreading, wiry shrub, in the family Macarthuriaceae endemic to Western Australia.  It grows from  0.15-0.75 m high and has white/white-cream flowers, and may be seen in flower from May to February although mainly from August to September. It grows on sand and laterite, on coastal sandplains, sandhills, and roadsides.

Ecology
The seeds are dispersed by ants.

References

Flora of Western Australia
Plants described in 1837
Taxa named by Stephan Endlicher
Taxa named by Charles von Hügel
Caryophyllales